Mustapha Adrar (born 12 April 1982) is an Algerian basketball player who plays for GS Pétroliers and Algeria.

Honours

Club
GS Pétroliers
Super Division: 2010, 2011, 2012, 2014, 2015, 2016, 2017, 2018, 2019.
Algerian Basketball Cup: 2009, 2011, 2012, 2013, 2014, 2015, 2016.

BAL career statistics

Retrieved from RealGM

|-
| style="text-align:left;"|2021
| style="text-align:left;"|GS Pétroliers
| 3 || 0 || 12.4 || .267 || .273 || –|| 2.7 || 1.3 || .3 || .0 || 3.7
|-
|- class="sortbottom"
| style="text-align:center;" colspan="2"|Career
| 3 || 0 || 12.4 || .267 || .273 || –|| 2.7 || 1.3 || .3 || .0 || 3.7

References

External links
 Profile basketball.afrobasket
 RealGM.com profile

1982 births
Living people
Algerian men's basketball players
Centers (basketball)
GS Pétroliers basketball players
People from Algiers
21st-century Algerian people